Gustine Airport  is a public airport located two miles (3.2 km) east of Gustine, serving Merced County, California, United States. It is mostly used for general aviation.

Facilities and aircraft 

For the 12-month period ending May 18, 2011, the airport had 8,000 aircraft operations, an average of 22 per day: 100% general aviation, 0% air taxi, 0% scheduled commercial, and 0% military. There are 19 aircraft based at this airport: 16 single engine, one multi-engine, two ultralights, and no jet aircraft.

References 
Gustine Airport (official page from Merced County Association of Governments)

External links 

Airports in Merced County, California
San Joaquin Valley